Aleksei Alekseyevich Birelev (16 March 1844 – 6 February 1915) was an admiral in the Imperial Russian Navy, a member of the State Council and Minister of the Navy in the Imperial Government.

Biography
Birilev was born into a family of relatively poor Russian nobility, without an estate. He entered the Imperial Russian Navy in 1859 as a cabin boy, graduating from the Sea Cadet Corps in 1862 and was commissioned as a lieutenant in 1868. He made two trips around the world, from 1859-1865 and 1869-1872.

Birilev was promoted to rear admiral in 1894 and commanded the ordnance department of the Russian Navy.

From 1900 to 1904, he commanded the Mediterranean squadron of the Russian Navy becoming vice admiral in 1901. In February 1904 he was appointed commander of the Baltic Fleet and military governor of Kronstadt. In May 1905 he was appointed commander of the Pacific Fleet, and departed for Vladivostok where he was intended to assume command of the Second Pacific Squadron from Admiral Zinovy Rozhestvensky on its arrival. However, he heard of the defeat at the Battle of Tsushima while still traveling on the Trans-Siberian Railway, and immediately sent a telegram to Tsar Nicholas II asking to be relieved of the command. He returned to Saint Petersburg after only two months in Vladivostok.

In July 1905 he replaced Fyodor Avelan as Navy Minister, holding this position until January 1907. He made efforts to rebuild the Imperial Russian Navy, but with limited success. From November 1905, he was also a member of the State Council. He chaired the Admiralty Council and was on the National Defence Council. He was also one of the signatories to the secret Treaty of Björkö between Russia and Germany. He was promoted to Admiral in July 1907. At the beginning of World War I, he started a charity to assist the injured and the families of sailors. He died in 1915.

Awards
 Order of St Vladimir 4th degree
 Order of St Vladimir 3rd degree
 Order of St Vladimir 2nd degree
 Order of St. Anne 3rd degree 
 Order of St. Anne 2nd degree 
 Order of St. Anne 1st degree 
 Order of St. Stanislaus 3rd degree
 Order of St. Stanislaus 2nd degree
 Order of St. Stanislaus 1st degree
 Order of the White Eagle
 Order of St. Alexander Nevsky

Foreign orders and decorations
 : Grand Cordon, Order of Medjidie, 23 February 1900, during and audience with the Sultan in Constantinople.

References 

 Витте С. Ю. Воспоминания. М., 1960
 Гурко В. И. Черты и силуэты прошлого. М., 2000
 Джунковский В. Ф. Воспоминания. М., 1977
 Толстой, И. И. Воспоминания министра народного просвещения графа И. И. Толстого. 31 октября 1905 to 24 апреля 1906 гг. М., 1977

Notes

1844 births
1915 deaths
Imperial Russian Navy admirals
Russian military personnel of the Russo-Japanese War
Members of the State Council (Russian Empire)
People from Tver
Recipients of the Order of Saint Stanislaus (Russian), 1st class
Recipients of the Order of St. Anna, 1st class
Recipients of the Order of the White Eagle (Russia)
Recipients of the Order of St. Vladimir, 1st class
Burials at Nikolskoe Cemetery
Naval Cadet Corps alumni